Boeing Truss-Braced Wing are airliner designs studied by Boeing with braced, high aspect ratio wings.

SUGAR Volt 

SUGAR Volt is the hybrid aircraft concept proposed by a team led by Boeing's Research & Technology division. It is one of a series of concepts put forward in response to a request for proposals for future aircraft issued by NASA. It is proposed that SUGAR Volt would use two hybrid turbofans that burn conventional jet fuel when taking off, then use electric motors to power the engines while flying. SUGAR stands for Subsonic Ultragreen Aircraft Research; "Volt" suggests that it would be at least partly powered by electricity.

SUGAR Volt would have emissions about 70 percent lower than average airliners today. Noise pollution will also be lower than airliners today.
This hybrid-electric approach however remains to be balanced against increased complexity, large electric engine and battery size and weight.
Relying partly on electric power might reduce specific fuel consumption (SFC) compared to a standard turbine-only design (turbofan or lower-consumption turboprops).

SUGAR Volt is designed with a long, braced, high aspect ratio wing that decreases induced drag due to lift. The wings of SUGAR Volt would enable it to take off in a shorter distance and generate less noise. The outer wings of the SUGAR Volt should fold to save ground space, increasing weight.

Transonic truss-braced wing 

By early 2019, following extensive wind tunnel testing at NASA Ames Research Center, an optimized truss and more sweep for the  span wing allowed flying higher and faster, up from Mach 0.70–0.75 to Mach 0.80 like current jetliners.
Compared to aircraft with cantilevered wings, fuel burn should be reduced by 8-10%, and the technology should be ready in 2030-2035.
Aspect ratios up to 27 were evaluated, up from 8-10 for current narrowbodies.
The design was presented at the January 2019 AIAA conference and the wing folds outboard of the truss to use airport gates for the -span 737. (ICAO aerodrome code C)

The wing has 20° of sweep and was moved forward, the truss section was optimised, tapered with an increased root chord, has a trailing edge with forward sweep and generates lift.
It should be tested from early 2019 at the NASA Ames  transonic tunnel, then later in 2019 at the  subsonic tunnel at NASA Langley.
A full-scale X-plane could be developed and tested under NASA’s UEST plan, outlined in the New Aviation Horizons flight demonstration from 2023.
Boeing proposed to modify an MD-80 powered by turbofans, but it could test a series/parallel hybrid electric propulsor based on Rolls-Royce LibertyWorks’ EVE concept of a geared turbofan.
An  electric motor/generator mounted between the compressor and the variable pitch fan, fed by batteries to boost the takeoff and climb, allows for a smaller engine and improves efficiency by 4.5%  over a  mission.
A tail-mounted BLI fan would ingest and reenergize the slow airflow over the fuselage.

A full-scale demonstrator was announced on January 18, 2023, with NASA funding $425 million over seven years while Boeing and its partners will invest $725 million, as the airframer had already spent $110 million in sustainable aviation research.
Combined with better propulsion and materials, efficiency is targeted at 30% better than current Boeing 737 MAX and Airbus A320neo.
Using a shortened MD-90 airframe, the demonstrator should fly in 2028, outlining a possible family of 130-to-210-seat aircraft.

References

External links 

 

2010s United States experimental aircraft